Álvaro Fernández may refer to:
Alvaro Fernández de Valladares (died 1212), Spanish commandant
Álvaro Fernández Armero (born 1969), Spanish director
Álvaro Fernández (athlete) (born 1981), Spanish runner
Álvaro Fernández (Uruguayan footballer) (born 1985), Uruguayan footballer
Álvaro Fernández (footballer, born 1998), Spanish football goalkeeper
Álvaro Fernández (footballer, born 2003), Spanish football defender

See also
Álvaro Fernandes, 15th century Portuguese explorer